Alexei Sayle's Merry-Go-Round is a comedy sketch show which ran on BBC2 for a total of 6 episodes over one series in May and June 1998.

Alexei Sayle's final series was almost identical in format to The All New Alexei Sayle Show 
except with yet another change of writers. (This time they included Kevin Cecil, Dave Cummings, Kevin Gildea, Andy Riley and Edgar Wright). Unusually, there was no studio audience.

Sketches included the talents of Noel Fielding, Lee Hurst, Paul Putner, Gemma Rigg, Reece Shearsmith, Jessica Stevenson, David Walliams and Peter Serafinowicz

The continuing adventures of Bobby Chariot were chronicled. Now free from any obligation to be Alexei's warm-up man, he traversed a series of other career cul-de-sacs under the appalling management of the repulsive "Edna" (played by Denise Coffey). Meanwhile, Alexei Sayle himself was depicted as living in a Teletubbies-style burrow somewhere in the posh part of North London.

The show's theme song is a cover of "Merry-Go-Round" by Wild Man Fischer.

Sources

Johnson RK, British TV Show Reviews
"UK Comedy" on Memorable TV

References 

BBC television sketch shows
1990s British comedy television series
1998 British television series debuts
1998 British television series endings